The White Wires were a Canadian garage rock band formed in Ottawa, Ontario, Canada in 2007. The band is in rotation on CBC Radio. The Ottawa Citizen calls the band "energetic and entertaining" with a clear sense of mission, while the Ottawa Sun identifies them as one of the city’s "favourite bands".

The White Wires first 2008 independent release Girly Girly Girly was reissued in 2009 on Douchemaster as a self-titled The White Wires.  The band's second album WWII was released in 2010 on Dirtnap.  The band's third album WWIII was released in the summer of 2012.

History

Origin
In July 2007 Manhire (formerly of the Cryptomaniacs) moved to Ottawa from Calgary. Manhire is the founder of Going Gaga Records, the founder of Ottawa's music festival Going Gaga Weekend, and co-founder of the "Rock N' Roll Pizza Party" (RRPP) events. The White Wires members are Luke Martin (also of Street Meat, Million Dollar Marxists), Allie Hanlon (also of Peach Kelli Pop), and Ian Manhire (also of the Sedatives).

The White Wires were formed in September 2007 in Ottawa at one of the city's RRPP events.  The band's name is taken from a song written by primary lyricist Manhire. The band first played under this moniker at their performance 28 December 2007 at the Cafe Dekcuf.

Girly Girly Girly  (2008–2009)
The band's first full-length album Girly Girly Girly was released independently in 2008 on Manhire's label Going Gaga. The vinyl album had a limited pressing of 325 copies. It was reissued as a self-titled album The White Wires 3 November 2009 on Atlanta's Douchemaster Records and was made available on Apple's iTunes service 14 September 2009. Also in 2009, the band contributed the single "Let It Go" to Ottawa Gaga Volume One released on Going Gaga.

In August 2009, the band signed for a new album with Portland, Oregon's punk rock music label Dirtnap Records. Also, the band finished recording two complete 45's.  The first 45 rpm single was "Pretty Girl".  It was released 11 September 2009 on Chicago's Trouble in Mind Records. The second 45 rpm single was "Pogo Til I Puke Tonight".  This recording was released March 2010 on Toronto's Ugly Pop Records.

WWII (2010–2011)
The band recorded a cover of The Messengers' 1971 song "That's the Way a Woman Is". The four track various artists' compilation album Trouble in Mind 7" was released 17 April 2010 by Chicago's Trouble in Mind Records.  Only 1,000 copies of this 7" EP were pressed as part of a promotional compilation featuring cover songs by Trouble in Mind artists.

In 2010 the band recorded a cover of The Nerves song "Letter to G" written by Jack Lee. It was initially released as an audio cassette 27 December 2010 on Los Angeles' Volar Records titled Under the Covers: A Tribute to Paul Collins, Peter Case and Jack Lee.

In March 2010 The White Wires met The Mean Jeans a band from Portland, Oregon.  The two bands became good friends and decided to record together. The first single from this collaboration was "Please Write" released 31 August 2010 on Dirtnap Records. The band's second single from their collaboration "Born on a Saturday Night" from the split-single I Remember How / Born on a Saturday Night was a song written by The Mean Jeans.  The single was co-released 2 September 2010 on German P. Trash Records and German Timmeheiehumme Records to coincide with the band's European tour.

Their second full-length album WWII was released to Apple's iTunes service 30 November 2010.
The first single from their 2010 album WWII was "Be True to Your School ('Til You Get Kicked Out)".

The band's third album WWIII is expected for release in July 2012.

Live performances
The band played the Ottawa Bluesfest 17 July 2010.
The band played the Halifax Pop Explosion 22 October 2010. The band's release party for WWII was 23 December 2010 at the Babylon Club in Ottawa.

Band members
Ian Manhire – lyricist, lead vocals, guitar (2007–present)
Luke Martin – bass guitar, backing vocals (2007–present)
Allie Hanlon – drums (2007–present)

Discography

Singles

Split singles

Various artists compilations

Albums

Footnotes

Notes

Citations

References

External links
 PunkOttawa.com
 Standard Issue (punk print zine)
 Rock N’ Roll Pizza Party (RRPP)

Musical groups established in 2007
Musical groups from Ottawa
Canadian garage rock groups
2007 establishments in Ontario